Joaquín Nehemias Rikemberg (born 4 January 1999) is an Argentine professional footballer who plays as a midfielder for Torneo Federal A side Club Villa Mitre.

Career
Rikemberg started his professional career with Argentine Primera División side Belgrano, making his debut on 18 December 2016 in a match versus Rosario Central. Before his debut, Rikemberg was an unused substitute in a game against Tigre on 6 November.

Career statistics
.

References

External links

1999 births
Living people
People from Neuquén
Argentine footballers
Association football midfielders
Argentine Primera División players
Torneo Federal A players
Club Atlético Belgrano footballers
Villa Mitre footballers